The single cylinder engine had been a mainstay of the Harley-Davidson line since the early days of the company's founding in 1884, but it was not until 1909 that the V-twin design was added. It was Introduced in 1926, and it disappeared from the program in 1934 and was reintroduced in 1937 as Harley-Davidson V - Twin B.

History

It was introduced in 1926 and modified and modernized to meet the needs of foreign markets where it was most popular. It was followed by the lightweight Model C Harley, followed by a variety of DKW-based designs.

See also

List of Harley-Davidson motorcycles
List of motorcycles of the 1920s

References

External links

B
Motorcycles introduced in the 1920s
Single-cylinder motorcycles